The men's individual all-around competition was one of eight events for male competitors in artistic gymnastics at the 1984 Summer Olympics in Los Angeles. The qualification and final rounds took place on July 29, 31 and August 2 at UCLA's Pauley Pavilion. There were 71 competitors from 19 nations. Each nation could send a team of 6 gymnasts or up to 3 individual gymnasts. The event was won by Kōji Gushiken of Japan, the nation's fourth victory in the event (tying Italy for second-most at the time, behind the Soviet Union's five). The United States won its first medal in the event since the 1904 Games in St. Louis with Peter Vidmar's silver. China, making its debut in the event, received bronze with Li Ning finishing third.

Background

This was the 19th appearance of the men's individual all-around. The first individual all-around competition had been held in 1900, after the 1896 competitions featured only individual apparatus events. A men's individual all-around has been held every Games since 1900.

None of the top 10 gymnasts from the 1980 Games returned; 9 of the 10 were from nations that boycotted the 1984 Games, while Dan Grecu of Romania had retired after being injured in 1980 (his fourth Games). The highest-ranked finisher from Moscow to return was 20th-place finisher Michel Boutard of France. The Soviets, absent from Los Angeles, had taken four of the seven medals at the two World Championships since Moscow; Kōji Gushiken of Japan had taken two of the rest (bronze in 1981, silver in 1983) and Lou Yun had shared bronze in 1983 for the last one.

The People's Republic of China and San Marino each made their debut in the event. France made its 17th appearance, most among nations.

Competition format

The competition format followed the preliminary and final format introduced in 1972, with the limit on the number of finalists per nation added in 1976. All entrants in the gymnastics competitions performed both a compulsory exercise and a voluntary exercise for each apparatus. The scores for all 12 exercises were summed to give an individual all-around preliminary score. Half of the scores from the preliminary carried over to the final, with the top 36 gymnasts advancing to the individual all-around final—except that each nation was limited to 3 finalists. There, each of the finalists performed another exercise on each apparatus. The sum of these scores plus half of the preliminary score resulted in a final total.

Each exercise was scored from 0 to 10; thus, the preliminary apparatus scores ranged from 0 to 20 each and the total preliminary score from 0 to 120. With half of the preliminary score and six more exercises scored 0 to 10, the final total was also from 0 to 120.

The preliminary exercise scores were also used for qualification for the apparatus finals.

Schedule

All times are Pacific Daylight Time (UTC-7)

Results

Seventy-one gymnasts competed in the compulsory and optional rounds on July 29 and 31. The thirty-six highest scoring gymnasts advanced to the final on August 2. Each country was limited to three competitors in the final. Half of the points earned by each gymnast during both the compulsory and optional rounds carried over to the final. This constitutes each gymnast's "prelim" score.

References

External links
Official Olympic Report
www.gymnasticsresults.com
www.gymn-forum.net

Men's individual all-around
Men's events at the 1984 Summer Olympics